Vasco Mira Godinho (born 5 September 1989, Evora) is a Portuguese equestrian athlete. He competed at the 2018 FEI World Equestrian Games and at the 2017 FEI European Championships in Gothenburg.

References

1989 births
Living people
Portuguese male equestrians
Portuguese dressage riders